The Mountain Diatreme is a diatreme in the Northwest Territories, Canada, located  southwest of Norman Wells.

See also
Volcanism of Canada
Volcanism of Northern Canada
List of volcanoes in Canada

References

Diatremes of the Northwest Territories